Stripe 82 is a 300 deg2 equatorial field of sky that was imaged multiple times by the Sloan Digital Sky Survey from 2000 to 2008. It approximately covers the region with right ascension from 20:00h to 4:00h and declination from -1.26° to +1.26°.

Stripe 82 has also been observed using many other telescopes and instruments, a list of which is given below.

Current data available on Stripe 82

Imaging

Optical/UV Imaging
 SDSS Co-adds (Jiang, LSST, Huff, Annis)
 CFHT i-band ('CS82)
 CFHTLS
 DES
 HSC
 GALEX

Near-IR
 UKIDSS
 VHS
 NEWFIRM (Jiang)
 VICS82 (CFHT and VISTA)

Mid-IR
 SHELA
 SpIES
 WISE
 IRAC High-z quasars

Far-IR
 HELMS
 vHerS

Radio/mm
 VLA-L (Hodge et al. 2011, Heywood et al. 2016)
 VLA-S (Hallinan)
 ACT

X-ray
 Chandra (LaMassa)
 XMM (LaMassa)
 Swift

Spectra

 SDSS-DR7
 SDSS-DR10
 HETDEX

 Wigglez
 VVDS

 PRIMUS
 DEEP2
 VIPERS

References

Sky regions